Emin's gerbil or Emin's tateril (Taterillus emini) is a species of rodent found in the Democratic Republic of the Congo, Ethiopia, Kenya, Sudan, and Uganda. Its natural habitats are dry savanna, subtropical or tropical dry lowland grassland, and arable land.

References
Musser, G. G. and M. D. Carleton. 2005. Superfamily Muroidea. pp. 894–1531 in Mammal Species of the World a Taxonomic and Geographic Reference. D. E. Wilson and D. M. Reeder eds. Johns Hopkins University Press, Baltimore.

Taterillus
Mammals described in 1892
Taxa named by Oldfield Thomas
Rodents of Africa
Taxonomy articles created by Polbot